Parliamentary elections were held in the Republic of the Congo on 11 December 1963. They followed a constitutional referendum on 8 December, which approved a constitution that made the country a one-party state. Although it did not come into force until July 1964, the National Movement of the Revolution was the sole party to contest the election, and won all seats. Voter turnout was 91.7%.

Results

References

Elections in the Republic of the Congo
Congo
Parliamentary election
One-party elections
Republic of the Congo parliamentary election